Parkesburg National Bank is a historic bank building located at Parkesburg, Chester County, Pennsylvania.  It was built in two sections; the older dating to 1883 and the second from about 1900.  Both are three-story, brick structures on banked basements. The older section has a patterned slate mansard roof with rounded dormer windows in the Second Empire style.  The addition is faced in concrete, with floral patterns, a lion's head, and the bank's insignia.  It is generally in the Classical Revival style.  The building has been converted to apartments.

It was added to the National Register of Historic Places in 1980.

References

Bank buildings on the National Register of Historic Places in Pennsylvania
Second Empire architecture in Pennsylvania
Neoclassical architecture in Pennsylvania
Commercial buildings completed in 1900
Buildings and structures in Chester County, Pennsylvania
National Register of Historic Places in Chester County, Pennsylvania